A list of films produced by the Tollywood (Bengali language film industry) based in Kolkata in the year 2004.

Highest-grossing
 Bandhan

A-Z of films

References

External links
 Tollywood films of 2005 at the Internet Movie Database

2004
Lists of 2004 films by country or language
 Bengali
2004 in Indian cinema